Ventsislav (Bulgarian: Венцислав) is a Bulgarian-language masculine given name. The feminine form is Ventsislava (Bulgarian: Венцислава). It is a variant of the name Wenceslaus, meaning "great glory". The name day for this name in Bulgaria is 27 December.

People
Ventsislav Aldev (Bulgarian: Венцислав Алдев: born 11 August 1977), Bulgarian footballer
Ventsislav Aydarski (Bulgarian: Венцислав Айдарски: born 17 February 1991), Bulgarian swimmer
Ventsislav Bengyuzov (Bulgarian: Венцислав Бенгюзов; born on 22 January 1991), Bulgarian footballer
Ventsislav Bonev (Bulgarian: Венцислав Бонев; born 8 May 1980), Bulgarian footballer who plays as a defender
Ventsislav Dimitrov (Bulgarian: Венцислав Димитров; born 27 March 1988), Bulgarian footballer
Ventsislav Hristov (Bulgarian: Венцислав Христов; born 9 November 1988), Bulgarian footballer
Ventsislav Ivanov (Bulgarian: Венцислав Иванов; born 20 May 1982), Bulgarian footballer
Ventsislav Ivanov (footballer, born 1995) (Bulgarian: Венцислав Иванов; born 7 September 1995), Bulgarian footballer
Ventsislav Kerchev (Bulgarian: Венцислав Керчев; born 2 June 1997), Bulgarian footballer
Ventsislav Marinov (born 21 February 1983), Bulgarian footballer who plays as a defender
Ventsislav Radev (Bulgarian: Венцислав Радев; born 9 January 1961), Bulgarian hurdler
Ventsislav Varbanov (Bulgarian: Венцислав Василев Върбанов) (born 16 April 1962), Bulgarian politician
Ventsislav Vasilev (Bulgarian: Венцислав Василев; born 8 July 1988), Bulgarian footballer who plays as a defender 
Ventsislav Velinov (Bulgarian: Венцислав Велинов) (born 2 January 1981), Bulgarian footballer who plays as a goalkeeper
Ventsislav Yankov (Bulgarian: Венцислав Янков) (born 24 March 1926), Bulgarian pianist and pedagogue
Ventsislav Yordanov (Bulgarian: Венцислав Йорданов; born 15 January 1986), Bulgarian footballer 
Ventsislav Zhelev (Bulgarian: Венцислав Желев) (born 28 February 1980), Bulgarian footballer

See also
Višeslav
Boleslaw (given name)

Bulgarian masculine given names